Christopher Lema (born August 5, 1996) is an American soccer player who most recently played as a midfielder for USL Championship side San Antonio FC.

Career

Youth
Lema grew up in Ridgefield, New Jersey and played soccer at Ridgefield Memorial High School. He joined the New York Red Bulls Academy in 2010. He attended college at Georgetown University and played on the Hoyas soccer team for four seasons, making 78 appearances, scoring 5 goals and tallying 12 assists.

While in college, Lema appeared for Premier Development League side New York Red Bulls U-23.

New York Red Bulls II

On March 15, 2018, Lema signed his first professional contract with New York Red Bulls II. Lema made his debut with New York Red Bulls II on April 14, 2018, coming on as a substitute in a 5–0 victory over Tampa Bay Rowdies. On July 6, 2018, Lema scored his first goal for New York in a 6–1 victory over Atlanta United 2. In Lema's first season with New York Red Bulls II he helped the club reach the Eastern Conference Final, falling short to the eventual winners Louisville City FC.

On July 17, 2019, Lema scored four goals in an 8–1 victory over Atlanta United 2. As one of the top players in the league, at the conclusion of the 2019 season Lema was named to the USL Championship All-League Second Team.

Lema was released by New York following their 2020 season.

On January 14, 2021, Lema signed for USL Championship side San Antonio FC.

Career statistics

References

External links

guhoyas.com Profile

1996 births
Living people
American soccer players
Association football midfielders
Georgetown Hoyas men's soccer players
Soccer players from New Jersey
People from Ridgefield, New Jersey
Sportspeople from Bergen County, New Jersey
FC Dallas draft picks
New York Red Bulls II players
USL Championship players
New York Red Bulls players
Ridgefield Memorial High School alumni
San Antonio FC players